AirSprint is a Canadian company that offers fractional ownership and management of private business jet aircraft. AirSprint was founded in 2000 as the first fractional aircraft ownership company in Canada by current Chairman, Judson Macor. Today, AirSprint operates the youngest fleet of fractional aircraft in North America and is the largest provider of fractional aircraft in Canada. In 2017, AirSprint was the fastest growing fractional aviation company globally.

Fleet

The AirSprint fleet consists of the following aircraft (as of December 2022):

See also
Flexjet
PlaneSense
NetJets

References

External links

AirSprint website

Fractional aircraft ownership companies
Regional airlines of Alberta
Canadian companies established in 2000